Hannah Green (1927–1996) was an American author, born in Cincinnati, Ohio and lived on Barrow Street, in Greenwich Village, New York. As an undergraduate at Wellesley, she enrolled in Vladimir Nabokov's survey of Russian literature in translation, which she later wrote about in The New Yorker. Ms. Green completed her MFA at Stanford University with Wallace Stegner. There she met Tillie Olsen, and the two began a lifelong friendship. In 1960, she was a recipient of the first of many MacDowell Colony residencies. Among her published work are articles  in The New Yorker, the books, The Dead of the House (1973) and Golden Spark, Little Saint: My Book of the Hours of Saint Foy (2000),  and the children's book, In the City of Paris. For several years, Ms. Green taught in the writing programs of Stanford, Columbia, and New York University. Until her death in 1996, she was married to the American artist John Wesley.

References

External links
Hannah Green Papers (Stanford University, Special Collections)

1927 births
1996 deaths
Writers from Cincinnati
20th-century American novelists
American women short story writers
American women novelists
20th-century American women writers
20th-century American short story writers
Novelists from Ohio
Wellesley College alumni
Stanford University alumni